Idols Danmark or ("Idols: Ærlig Jagt. Ægte Talent") is the Danish version of the British music competition Pop Idol (2001–2003) created by Simon Fuller. After Pop Idol became a great success in England in 2001, announced the danish pay-channel TV3 in 2003, that they would launch a danish version of Idols. Idols premiered on danish television in September 2003 with the two hosts Tomas Villum Jensen and Uffe Holm presenting the show, the premiere of Idols 2003 was watched by over 450,000 people and 188,000 people in average watched the first season, the judges in the first season was Thomas Blachman, Kjeld Wennick, Henriette Blix and Carsten Kroeyer. Idols returned once again in 2004, but the second season was not as successful as its predecessor, Idols 2004 is known as the shortest Idols season in the world, with production lasting no more than 3 months. It is also seen as one of the most unsuccessful seasons of all time, Thomas Blachman returned as the only remaining judge from the first season, along with the new judges Susanne Kier and Anders Hansen. Idols in Denmark was subsequently put on an indefinite hiatus after the second season.   

Although Idols in Denmark was never officially canceled, TV3 has not made any further announcement regarding the series since 2004. The series is now generally considered to have been canceled.    

However, in 2019 the creator of the Idols franchise Simon Fuller told that he's more than willing to give Idols in Denmark another shot if he received offers to bring it back on other networks, and when there is less competition on the TV talent show landscape.

Hosts and Judges

Winners of Idols in Denmark 
 Idols 2003: Christian Mendoza
 Idols 2004: Rikke Emma Niebuhr

Idols 2003
In mid-2003, auditions were held in Aarhus & Copenhagen. The best 30 contestants were chosen to perform in 3 groups of 10 in front of the Danish TV audience, the 3 contestants with the most votes per group advanced & one wildcard being chosen to the Top 10.

Filipino born Christian Mendoza won the first season over Mirza Radonjica with a 57% gain of the total vote.

I 2009 finalist Kasper Ehlers joint series two of The X Factor in Denmark, where he was part of first runners-up Alien Beat Club.

Finals elimination chart

Idols 2004
Idols 2004 in Denmark has the record for shortest Idol program in production with production lasting no more than 3 months.

Rikke Emma Niebuhr from Aarhus won with 65% of the total vote over Louise Baltzer Jensen from Frederiksværk.

Season two of Idols Denmark is often cited as the most unsuccessful of all Idol seasons with confirmed sources listing that not even 1,000 people had bothered to turn up to the auditions again in Aarhus & Copenhagen.

The winner was Rikke Emma Niebuhr over the runner-up Louise Baltzer Jensen. Rikke was  denied her promised contract with BMG Denmark, though her debut single Get There sold moderately well.

Finals elimination chart

 
Danish reality television series
Danish music television series
Television series by Fremantle (company)
2003 Danish television series debuts
2004 Danish television series endings
2000s Danish television series
Danish television series based on British television series
Danish-language television shows
TV3 (Denmark) original programming